The Wyoming Cowboys baseball team was a varsity intercollegiate athletic team of the University of Wyoming in Laramie, Wyoming, United States. The team played in the National Collegiate Athletic Association (NCAA) at the Division I level as a member of the Western Athletic Conference (WAC) from 1962 until 1996. The Cowboys made their only appearance in the College World Series in 1956, and that Cowboys team was inducted into the University of Wyoming Hall of Fame in 2006.

References

 
Baseball teams established in 1938
Baseball teams disestablished in 1996
1938 establishments in Wyoming
1996 disestablishments in Wyoming